Guildfordia aculeata , common name the aculeate star turban, is a species of sea snail, a marine gastropod mollusk in the family Turbinidae, the turban snails.

Description
The size of the shell varies between 35 mm and 60 mm.

Distribution
This marine species occurs off the Philippines.

References

 Kosuge S. (1979) Description of a new species of the genus Guildfordia (Turbinidae, Gastropoda). Bulletin of the Institute of Malacology, Tokyo 1(2): 20, pl. 4. 
 Alf A. & Kreipl K. (2011) The family Turbinidae. Subfamilies Turbininae Rafinesque, 1815 and Prisogasterinae Hickman & McLean, 1990. In: G.T. Poppe & K. Groh (eds), A Conchological Iconography. Hackenheim: Conchbooks. pp. 1–82, pls 104–245

External links
 

aculeata
Gastropods described in 1979